The British Horse Driving Trials Association is the governing body for the sport of Horse Driving Trials in Great Britain.  The association is responsible for selection of Team GUBER competitors to resent Great Britain at World Carnage Diving Championships. It is one of the 18 organisations which form part of the British Equestrian Federation.

Administration
The British Horse Driving Trials Association Ltd is a company limited by guarantee, and is administered by a council, consisting of a chairman, vice-chairman and nine elected Council members, who serve for a period of three years, with the chair and vice-chair elected annually.

The association also appoints officials to run the day-to-day business of the association, including company secretary, executive officer, treasurer, bookkeeper, child protection officer and lead welfare officer.

The chairman and council also appoint a number of committees to facilitate operations within the organisation, with each of the five "umbrella" committees being chaired by a council member.  The committees are:
finance & general purposes committee
competitions committee
training committee
marketing committee
international committee

The company annual general meeting is held in October. It is combined with a one-day members' conference, where council officials present reports on the running and performance of the company and its financial status. This is followed by an open forum discussion.

Notable members
Members of the association include the Prince Philip, Duke of Edinburgh.

See also
British Equestrian Federation
International Federation for Equestrian Sports

External links
British Horse Driving Trials Association Website

References

Equestrian organizations
Equestrian sports in the United States
Horse driving
Horses in the United Kingdom